Jonathan Harris (born August 4, 1996) is an American football defensive end for the Denver Broncos of the National Football League (NFL). He played college football at Lindenwood.

College career
Harris was a member of the Lindenwood Lions, redshirting his true freshman season. He finished his collegiate career with 183 tackles (38.5 for loss), 22 sacks, four forced fumbles, an interception and a fumble recovery.

Professional career

Chicago Bears
Harris signed with the Chicago Bears as an undrafted free agent on May 3, 2019. He was waived on August 31, 2019 during final roster cuts but was re-signed to the Bears' practice squad the following day.  Harris was promoted to the Bears active roster on September 28, 2019. Harris made his NFL debut on September 29, 2019 against the Minnesota Vikings. He was waived on October 22.

Denver Broncos
On October 23, 2019, Harris was claimed off waivers by the Denver Broncos. He was waived with a non-football illness designation on August 12, 2020, and reverted to the team's reserve/non-football illness list after clearing waivers the next day.

On September 1, 2021, Harris was waived by the Broncos and re-signed to the practice squad. He was promoted to the active roster on January 3, 2022.

On August 30, 2022, Harris was waived by the Broncos and signed to the practice squad the next day. He was promoted to the active roster on November 15.

References

External links 
Lindenwood Lions bio
Chicago Bears bio

1996 births
Living people
Players of American football from Illinois
Sportspeople from Aurora, Illinois
Lindenwood Lions football players
American football defensive ends
Chicago Bears players
Denver Broncos players